La Spigolatrice is a statue by Emanuele Stifano, installed in Sapri, Italy. The 2021 artwork depicts a woman from Luigi Mercantini's poem The Gleaner of Sapri.

References

2021 establishments in Italy
2021 sculptures
Outdoor sculptures in Italy
Sculptures of women in Italy
Statues in Italy
Statues of fictional characters